Fulton County is the westernmost county in the U.S. state of Kentucky, with the Mississippi River forming its western boundary. As of the 2020 census, the population was 6,515. Its county seat is Hickman and its largest city is Fulton. The county was formed in 1845 from Hickman County, Kentucky and named for Robert Fulton, the inventor of the  steamboat.

Allied with Tennessee by trade and culture, white Fulton County residents were largely pro-Confederate during the American Civil War. Forces from both armies passed through the county during different periods of the conflict. Because of imprecise early surveying of Kentucky's southern border, Fulton County is divided into two non-contiguous parts. An exclave on the peninsula in the Kentucky Bend of the Mississippi River can be reached only by road through Tennessee.

History
The rural county was not organized until 1845, from a portion of Hickman County. It was named for Robert Fulton, inventor of the steamboat. Hickman, Kentucky was designated as the county seat. The county was developed for agriculture, which was originally dependent on slave labor. Area farmers had ties to Tennessee planters, and shipped produce down the Mississippi River, which formed the county's western border. They supported the Confederacy, while Kentucky maintained official neutrality as a Border State.

During the post-Reconstruction period, there was considerable racial violence by whites against blacks in Fulton County; they exercised terrorism to re-establish and maintain white supremacy. Whites lynched 20 African Americans here from 1877 to 1950; most were killed around the turn of the 20th century. This was by far the highest total of any county in the state, more than ten times the total in many other counties. Five men were lynched from 1883 to 1917, for alleged rape, assault, barn burning, and robbery and murder.

After the Civil War, some African Americans became landowners in the county. A notably egregious lynching was that on October 3, 1908, in Hickman of David Walker and his entire family by 50 Night Riders. This may have been part of anarchic violence that was directed at blacks arising from the "Reelfoot Lake Uprising", but it also appeared that whites coveted Walker's land. Walker and his wife, an infant in arms, and three children were shot multiple times; the eldest son burned to death in their farmhouse; seven in total were killed on the night of October 3, 1908 in Hickman. Walker owned a 21 1/2 acre farm; his white neighbor took it over after the killings, and later sold it to another white man. One of the latter's descendants continues to own the rural land.

On December 16, 1918, Private Charles Lewis, a veteran of World War I, was lynched at Tyler Station. Private Lewis was accused of robbery and while he was held in the local jail, a group of masked men forced their way into the jail, smashed the locks with a sledgehammer, then took him outside and hanged him from a tree.

Geography

About  of the county is separated in a peninsula from the rest of the state by an oxbow of the Mississippi River, known as the Kentucky Bend or New Madrid Bend, after the city in Missouri on the north side of the river. Travelers going there have to pass into Tennessee by road (there is no bridge from Missouri) and then go north to reach the Kentucky Bend exclave.  The lowest point in the state of Kentucky is located on the Mississippi River in Kentucky Bend in Fulton County, where it flows past Kentucky and between Tennessee and Missouri. It is expected that over time, the river will cut across the short neck of the peninsula, cutting it off entirely from Kentucky, with land gradually filling in behind it to connect it to Missouri.

Adjacent counties
 Mississippi County, Missouri  (northwest)
 Hickman County  (northeast)
 Obion County, Tennessee  (south)
 Lake County, Tennessee  (southwest)
 New Madrid County, Missouri  (west)

National protected area
 Reelfoot National Wildlife Refuge (part)

Major highways

Demographics

2020 census

As of the 2020 United States Census, there were 6,515 people, 2,441 households, and 1,425 families residing in the county.

2000 census
As of the census of 2000, there were 7,752 people, 3,237 households, and 2,113 families residing in the county. The racial makeup of the county was 75.12% White, 23.19% Black or African American, 0.12% Native American, 0.31% Asian, 0.32% from other races, and 0.94% from two or more races. 0.72% of the population were Hispanic or Latino of any race.

There were 3,237 households, out of which 29.30% had children under the age of 18 living with them, 44.40% were married couples living together, 18.00% had a female householder with no husband present, and 34.70% were non-families. 32.30% of all households were made up of individuals, and 16.20% had someone living alone who was 65 years of age or older. The average household size was 2.32 and the average family size was 2.92.

In the county, the population was spread out, with 24.90% under the age of 18, 8.90% from 18 to 24, 25.50% from 25 to 44, 23.20% from 45 to 64, and 17.50% who were 65 years of age or older. The median age was 38 years. For every 100 females, there were 87.70 males. For every 100 females age 18 and over, there were 82.00 males.

The median income for a household in the county was $24,382, and the median income for a family was $30,788. Males had a median income of $26,401 versus $19,549 for females. The per capita income for the county was $14,309. About 20.10% of families and 23.10% of the population were below the poverty line, including 32.30% of those under age 18 and 16.00% of those age 65 or over.

Politics
Fulton County was a Democratic stronghold for most of its history and was one of the few Kentucky counties carried by Al Gore in 2000. Since then, however, it has swung sharply towards the Republican Party.

Education
 Fulton County School District
 Fulton Independent Schools

Media
 WENK-AM 1240 "The Greatest Hits of All Time"
 WWGY 99.3 "Today's Best Music with Ace & TJ in the Morning"

Communities

Cities
 Fulton
 Hickman (county seat)

Census-designated place
 Cayce

Other unincorporated communities

 Bondurant
 Brownsville
 Crutchfield
 Jordan
 Kentucky Bend
 Mabel
 Miller
 Riceville
 Sassafras Ridge
 State Line
 Tyler

See also

 National Register of Historic Places listings in Fulton County, Kentucky

References

Further reading
 L. Otley Pindar, "List of the Birds of Fulton County, Kentucky," The Auk, vol. 6 (1889), pp. 310–316.

 
Kentucky counties
Kentucky counties on the Mississippi River
1845 establishments in Kentucky
Populated places established in 1845
Exclaves in the United States